This list contains the year and name of Past Grand Madam Presidents for the Fraternal Order of Eagles

Past Grand Madam Presidents

 1952 — Alta Smith 
 1952 — Kay Guy 
 1953 — Mary Dunn
 1954 — Carol Bennett
 1955 — Virginia Turner
 1956 — Chloe Honeycutt
 1957 — Elizabeth Baum
 1958 — Stella Moorehouse
 1959 — Lois Nelson Fargo   
 1960 — Adaline Navarra
 1960 — Georgia Walker  
 1961 — Evelyn Schreier
 1962 — Cora Rigg
 1963 — Isabel Vallie
 1964 — Juanita Dix
 1965 — Frances Vanis
 1966 — Kay Williamson
 1967 — Nora Belle Goodman
 1968 — Alta Lewin
 1969 — Yvonne Magnan
 1970 — Dorothy Wilding
 1971 — Ruby Bigoni 
 1972 — Lucille Lewis-McGovern
 1973 — Vera Dailey
 1974 — Imogene Harac (Zarecki)
 1975 — Clara Johnson-Harding  
 1976 — Verna Funke
 1977 — Dolores "Doadie" Cloclough
 1978 — Bonnie Quatkemeyer   
 1979 — Ruth Elderbrook
 1980 — Mildred "Millie" Johnson
 1981 — Paula Wilson 
 1982 — Doris Anderson
 1983 — Bess Lenarduzzi
 1984 — Marcella "Marcy" James 
 1984 — Fran Ehrmann 
 1985 — Jacquelin "Jackie" Spahn  
 1986 — Joanne "Jo" Rott Jamestown   
 1987 — Catherine "Cathy" Wilson  
 1988 — Jean Dockall  
 1989 — Katherine "Kathy" Gonzagowski
 1990 — Barbara Cyphers 
 1991 — Shirley Johnson   
 1992 — Alta Haslow  
 1993 — Joyce Avery 
 1994 — Iris McDermott   
 1995 — Lorraine Grimes  
 1996 — Carol Inge Spiro   
 1997 — Sharon Sabourin 
 1998 — Doris Bateson 
 1999 — Linda Heffner 
 2000 — Judy Sanders 
 2001 — Bettie L. Clark  
 2002 — Carleen Corum  
 2003 — Peggy L. Carver 
 2004 — Dorothy "Dottie" Beattie #1637 
 2004 — Pat Lazenby  
 2005 — Roxann Alley McGovern  
 2006 — Stephanie Smith
 2007 — Margaret Cox
 2008 — Pat Durham
 2009 — Jean Kerr
 2010 — Mary Myers
 2011 — Gwen Stallkamp
 2012 — Sally Villalva
 2013 — Katie Ziebol
 2014 — Gloria Mason
 2015 — Penny Skinner
 2016 — Judy Johnson
 2017 — Helen Poehner
 2018 - Althea Lane
 2019 - Gloria Williams
 2020 - Jacqueline Marble

See also
 List of Past Grand Worthy Presidents

Notes

References

Past Grand Madam Presidents